Golofeyevka is a rural locality (a selo) in Starooskolsky District, Belgorod Oblast, Russia. The population was 147 as of 2010. There are 2 streets.

Geography 
Golofeyevka is located 25 km south of Stary Oskol (the district's administrative centre) by road. Kazachok is the nearest rural locality.

References 

Rural localities in Starooskolsky District